Ereño is a town and municipality located in the province of Biscay, in the autonomous community of Basque Country, northern Spain.

Ereño is famous for its marble, in the 1st century CE the Romans were mining the quarries, which are no longer being used. There are literary references that call Ereño the “capital of the marble route”. That material can be found in numerous buildings in Urdaibai and also on the other side of the ocean.

According to historian Tomás de Goikolea, Ereño was built in the 9th century and the residents of the town may be direct descendants of the inhabitants of the Santimamiñe cave.

On 29 September, the San Miguel festival, a popular mass is held and a pilgrimage is done.

References
www.ereno.org

External links
 EREÑO in the Bernardo Estornés Lasa - Auñamendi Encyclopedia (Euskomedia Fundazioa) 

Municipalities in Biscay